McGlockton is a surname. Notable people with the surname include:

Chester McGlockton (1969–2011), American football player
Markeis McGlockton (1990–2018), American shooting victim